Knapp is a hamlet in Perth and Kinross, Scotland. The Rossie Priory, an extensive country estate owned by the Kinnaird family is just to the southwest. Knapp contains an old coaching house (now converted into a property) and a red telephone box.

References

Villages in Perth and Kinross